Marcus John Iavaroni (born September 15, 1956) is an American former professional basketball player and former head coach of the Memphis Grizzlies of the National Basketball Association (NBA). He has also served as an assistant coach for several NBA teams.

Iavaroni was a star player at Plainview, New York's John F. Kennedy High School in the 1970s and a teammate of Seth Greenberg.

Iavaroni, who joined the NBA at age 26 after playing four seasons in Europe, was an important role player as a rookie on the 1983 Philadelphia 76ers championship team, where he started 77 games in the regular season. In the 1983 NBA Finals, Iavaroni averaged 5.8 points and 5.5 rebounds in a four game sweep. He later played for the San Antonio Spurs, where he averaged career-highs of 6.7 points and 4.8 rebounds in 1985, and the Utah Jazz.

Iavaroni also played professionally in Brescia, Forlì and Málaga before retiring in 1992, playing a total of six seasons in Italy and Spain: four after his college career and two following his NBA career.

His coaching career began as a graduate assistant coach at his alma mater, the University of Virginia.  Following his playing career, he was also an assistant coach for two seasons at Bowling Green State University from 1992 to 1994.

The first NBA coaching experience for Iavaroni came in 1997, when he was hired as a Cleveland Cavaliers assistant, working mainly with forwards. In 1999, he moved to the front office of the Miami Heat as director of player development. Since 2002, he served as an assistant to Mike D'Antoni at the Phoenix Suns.

On May 30, 2007, Iavaroni was named the head coach of the Memphis Grizzlies. On January 22, 2009, he was fired by the Grizzlies after an 11–30 start to the 2008–09 season.

On June 5, 2009, the Toronto Raptors announced that Iavaroni would become an assistant coach to Jay Triano.

On July 17, 2010, the Los Angeles Clippers announced that Iavaroni would become an assistant coach to newly hired Vinny Del Negro. He remained in that role until 2013.

Head coaching record 

|-
| align="left" |Memphis
| align="left" |
|82||22||60||.268|| align="center" |5th in Southwest||—||—||—||—
| align="center" |Missed Playoffs
|-
| align="left" |Memphis
| align="left" |
|41||11||30||.268|| align="center" |(fired)||—||—||—||—
| align="center" |—
|-class="sortbottom"
| align="left" |Career
| ||123||33||90||.268|| ||—||—||—||—

References 

1956 births
Living people
American expatriate basketball people in Canada
American expatriate basketball people in Italy
American expatriate basketball people in Spain
American men's basketball coaches
American men's basketball players
Baloncesto Málaga players
Basket Brescia Leonessa players
Basketball coaches from New York (state)
Basketball players from New York City
Bowling Green Falcons men's basketball coaches
Fulgor Libertas Forlì players
Liga ACB players
Los Angeles Clippers assistant coaches
Memphis Grizzlies head coaches
Miami Heat assistant coaches
New York Knicks draft picks
Olimpia Milano players
People from Jamaica, Queens
People from Plainview, New York
Philadelphia 76ers players
Phoenix Suns assistant coaches
Power forwards (basketball)
San Antonio Spurs players
Sioux Falls Skyforce (CBA) players
Sportspeople from Nassau County, New York
Sportspeople from Queens, New York
Toronto Raptors assistant coaches
Utah Jazz players
Virginia Cavaliers men's basketball players